Mollar may refer to:

 Mollar (grape) or Listán negro, a Spanish wine grape varietal
 El Mollar, a settlement in Tucumán Province in northern Argentina
 Mollalar (40° 09' N 46° 52' E), Agdam or Mollar, a village in Azerbaijan

People with the surname
 Max Mollar (1929–1977), Australian rules footballer

See also
 Molar (disambiguation)